

First round selections

The following are the first round picks in the 1994 Major League Baseball draft.

Compensation picks

Compensation Picks

Other notable players
Troy Glaus, 2nd round, 37th overall by the San Diego Padres, but did not sign
Brian Meadows, 3rd round, 70th overall by the Florida Marlins
A. J. Pierzynski, 3rd round, 71st overall by the Minnesota Twins
Aaron Boone, 3rd round, 72nd overall by the Cincinnati Reds
Brian Rose, 3rd round, 75th overall by the Boston Red Sox
Scott Podsednik, 3rd round, 85th overall by the Texas Rangers
Danny Graves, 4th round, 101st overall by the Cleveland Indians
Tim Byrdak, 5th round, 135th overall by the Kansas City Royals
Javier Vázquez, 5th round, 140th overall by the Montreal Expos
Bob Howry, 5th round, 144th overall by the San Francisco Giants
Emil Brown, 6th round, 149th overall by the Oakland Athletics
Joe Mays, 6th round, 161st overall by the Seattle Mariners
Russell Branyan, 7th round, 185th overall by the Cleveland Indians
Geoff Blum, 7th round, 196th overall by the Montreal Expos
Ronnie Belliard, 8th round, 207th overall by the Milwaukee Brewers
Keith Foulke, 9th round, 256th overall by the San Francisco Giants
Wes Helms, 10th round, 286th overall by the Atlanta Braves
David Dellucci, 11th round, 295th overall by the Minnesota Twins, but did not sign
Bubba Trammell, 11th round, 305th overall by the Detroit Tigers
Scott Downs, 12th round, 342nd overall by the Atlanta Braves, but did not sign
Carl Pavano, 13th round, 355th overall by the Boston Red Sox
Daryle Ward, 15th round, 417th overall by the Detroit Tigers
Plácido Polanco, 19th round, 530th overall by the St. Louis Cardinals
Brett Tomko, 20th round, 552nd overall by the Los Angeles Dodgers, but did not sign
J. D. Drew, 20th round, 564th overall by the San Francisco Giants, but did not sign
Scott Sauerbeck, 23rd round, 624th overall by the New York Mets
John Halama, 23rd round, 640th overall by the Houston Astros
Jason Grilli, 24th round, 675th overall by the New York Yankees, but did not sign
Randy Wolf, 25th round, 692nd overall by the Los Angeles Dodgers, but did not sign
Michael Young, 25th round, 699th overall by the Baltimore Orioles, but did not sign
Corey Koskie, 26th round, 715th overall by the Minnesota Twins
Dave Roberts, 28th round, 781st overall by the Detroit Tigers
Éric Gagné, 30th round, 845th overall by the Chicago White Sox, but did not sign
Mark Hendrickson, 32nd round, 902nd overall by the Atlanta Braves, but did not sign
Chad Bradford, 34th round, 957th overall by the Chicago White Sox, but did not sign
Tim Hudson, 35th round, 961st overall by the Oakland Athletics, but did not sign
Eric Byrnes, 38th round, 1056th overall by the Los Angeles Dodgers, but did not sign
Brian Lawrence, 39th round, 1079th overall by the Minnesota Twins, but did not sign
Julio Lugo, 43rd round, 1193rd overall by the Houston Astros
Kyle Farnsworth, 47th round, 1290th overall by the Chicago Cubs
Jason Michaels, 49th round, 1323rd overall by the San Diego Padres, but did not sign
Jim Parque, 50th round, 1349th overall by the Los Angeles Dodgers, but did not sign
Morgan Ensberg, 61st round, 1534th overall by the Seattle Mariners, but did not sign
José Santiago, 70th round, 1627th overall by the Kansas City Royals
Johnny Estrada, 71st round, 1636th overall by the Houston Astros, but did not sign

NFL/NBA/NHL players drafted 
Trajan Langdon, 6th round, 150th overall by the San Diego Padres
Frank Sanders, 14th round, 385th overall by the Seattle Mariners, but did not sign
Charlie Ward, 18th round, 507th overall by the New York Yankees, but did not sign
Matt Herr, 29th round, 818th overall by the Atlanta Braves, but did not sign
Kerry Collins, 48th round, 1321st overall by the Toronto Blue Jays, but did not sign
D'Wayne Bates, 53rd round, 1420th overall by the Toronto Blue Jays, but did not sign
Eric Montross, 62nd round, 1547th overall by the Chicago Cubs, but did not sign
Glenn Foley, 72nd round, 1639th overall by the Florida Marlins, but did not sign
Hines Ward, 73rd round, 1646th overall by the Florida Marlins, but did not sign

References

External links
1994 MLB Draft Summary from The Baseball Cube
1994 Baseball Draft from Baseball Almanac

Major League Baseball draft
Draft
Major League Baseball draft